Botond Balogh (born 6 Jun 2002) is a Hungarian professional footballer who plays as a defender for Serie B club Parma and the Hungary U21 national team.

Club career

Parma
Balogh made his professional debut in the 2020–21 Coppa Italia on 28 October 2020 starting the whole game against Pescara in a 3–1 victory. On 31 October 2020 he made his debut in 2020–21 Serie A against Inter Milan.

International career
He was part of the Hungarian U-17 team at the 2019 UEFA European Under-17 Championship and 2019 FIFA U-17 World Cup,

He made his debut for Hungary national football team on 12 November 2021 in a World Cup qualifier against San Marino.

References

External links 

2002 births
Living people
Hungarian footballers
Hungary youth international footballers
Hungary under-21 international footballers
Hungary international footballers
Association football defenders
Parma Calcio 1913 players
Serie A players
Hungarian expatriate footballers
Expatriate footballers in Italy
People from Sopron
Sportspeople from Győr-Moson-Sopron County